Cotter is a city in western Louisa County, Iowa, United States. The population was 39 at the 2020 census. It is part of the Muscatine Micropolitan Statistical Area.

History
Cotter, originally called Cotterville, was laid out in 1878 by Margaret E. Cotter. It was located along the Chicago, Rock Island and Pacific Railroad.

Geography
Cotter is located on Iowa Highway 92 approximately 5.5 miles west of Columbus Junction and one mile east of the Louisa-Washington county line.

Demographics

2010 census
At the 2010 census there were 48 people in 19 households, including 14 families, in the city. The racial makup of the city was 100.0% White. Hispanic or Latino of any race were 29.2%.

Of the 19 households 21.1% had children under the age of 18 living with them, 63.2% were married couples living together, 5.3% had a female householder with no husband present, 5.3% had a male householder with no wife present, and 26.3% were non-families. 26.3% of households were one person and 5.3% were one person aged 65 or older. The average household size was 2.53 and the average family size was 2.86.

The median age was 44.5 years. 27.1% of residents were under the age of 18; 2.2% were between the ages of 18 and 24; 23% were from 25 to 44; 39.6% were from 45 to 64; and 8.3% were 65 or older. The gender makeup of the city was 33.3% male and 66.7% female.

2000 census
At the 2000 census there were 48 people in 19 households, including 14 families, in the city. The racial makup of the city was 85.42% White, 4.17% African American, 10.42% from other races. Hispanic or Latino of any race were 14.58%.

Of the 19 households 31.6% had children under the age of 18 living with them, 63.2% were married couples living together, 10.5% had a female householder with no husband present, and 26.3% were non-families. 10.5% of households were one person and none had someone living alone who was 65 or older. The average household size was 2.53 and the average family size was 2.79.

The age distribution was 25.0% under the age of 18, 8.3% from 18 to 24, 29.2% from 25 to 44, 31.3% from 45 to 64, and 6.3% 65 or older. The median age was 35 years. For every 100 females, there were 166.7 males. For every 100 females age 18 and over, there were 125.0 males.

The median household income was $41,250 and the median family income  was $26,250. Males had a median income of $34,375 versus $18,750 for females. The per capita income for the city was $13,879. There were 11.1% of families and 18.9% of the population living below the poverty line, including 37.5% of under eighteens and none of those over 64.

References

External links

Cities in Iowa
Cities in Louisa County, Iowa
Muscatine, Iowa micropolitan area